The Nandi Award for Best Children Film was commissioned in 1978:

Second best Children Film

References

Children Film